Gaâfour is a town and commune in the Siliana Governorate, north-western Tunisia, located 120 kilometers southwest of Tunis.
It is attached to Siliana. As of 2004 it had a population of 9,358 people.

The town has a station located on the railway linking Tunis to Kalaat Khasba.

See also
List of cities in Tunisia

References

Populated places in Tunisia
Communes of Tunisia
Tunisia geography articles needing translation from French Wikipedia